Angarsky District is an administrative district (raion), one of the thirty-three in Irkutsk Oblast, Russia. As a municipal division, it is incorporated as Angarskoye Urban Okrug. It is located in the southwest of the oblast. Its administrative center is the city of Angarsk. Population:  11,574 (2002 Census).

Administrative and municipal status
Within the framework of administrative divisions, Angarsky District is one of the thirty-three in the oblast. The city of Angarsk serves as its administrative center.

As a municipal division, the district has been incorporated as Angarskoye Urban Okrug since January 1, 2015. Prior to that date, the district was incorporated as Angarsky Municipal District, which was subdivided into two urban settlements and two rural settlements.

References

Notes

Sources

Registry of the Administrative-Territorial Formations of Irkutsk Oblast 

Districts of Irkutsk Oblast
